Wittgenstein is a 1993 experimental comedy-drama film directed by Derek Jarman and produced by Tariq Ali. An international co-production of the United Kingdom and Japan, the film is loosely based on the life story as well as the philosophical thinking of the philosopher Ludwig Wittgenstein. The adult Wittgenstein is played by Karl Johnson.

The original screenplay by literary critic Terry Eagleton was heavily rewritten during pre-production and shooting by Jarman, radically altering the style and structure, although retaining much of Eagleton's dialogue. The story is not played out in a traditional setting, but rather against a black backdrop within which the actors and key props are placed, as if in a theatre setting.

The film was originally part of a series of 12 films on the life and ideas of philosophers, produced by Ali on behalf of Channel Four. Only four of the scripts got commissioned: Socrates by Howard Brenton, Spinoza by Ali, Locke by David Edgar and Wittgenstein by Eagleton. Spinoza was filmed and directed by Chris Spencer as Spinoza : The Apostle of Reason. Citizen Locke was filmed and directed by Agnieszka Piotrowska. These were transmitted in 1994 as 52-minute television films.

Plot
The film, in a series of sketches, depicts Wittgenstein's life from boyhood, through the first World War period to his Cambridge professorship and association with Bertrand Russell and John Maynard Keynes. The emphasis is on the exposition of his ideas and depicts his characteristics as a homosexual, an intuitive, moody, proud, and perfectionistic thinker, and a genius.

Principal cast
 Clancy Chassay as young Wittgenstein
 Karl Johnson as adult Wittgenstein
 Nabil Shaban as Martian
 Michael Gough as Bertrand Russell
 Tilda Swinton as Lady Ottoline Morrell
 John Quentin as Maynard Keynes
 Kevin Collins as Johnny
 Lynn Seymour as Lydia Lopokova

Script
 Eagleton, Terry (1993). Wittgenstein: The Terry Eagleton Script, The Derek Jarman Film. London, England: British Film Institute, pp. 151.

Award
 Teddy Award for best feature film, 1993

Reception
Critical reception for the film has been generally positive and the movie holds a rating of 83% on Rotten Tomatoes, based on 6 reviews. Derek Elley of Variety described it as an "immaculately lensed, intellectual joke" with a "gay subtext". 

It opened the London Lesbian and Gay Film Festival and grossed a house record £7,210 in its first 3 days at the ICA in London.

See also
 List of avant-garde films of the 1990s

References

External links
 
 
 

1993 drama films
1993 films
1993 LGBT-related films
1990s avant-garde and experimental films
1990s biographical drama films
Biographical films about philosophers
British avant-garde and experimental films
British biographical drama films
British LGBT-related films
British nonlinear narrative films
1990s English-language films
Films directed by Derek Jarman
Films set in the 20th century
Ludwig Wittgenstein
1990s British films